Natural Fake is the sixth album by German project De-Phazz.

Track listing

Chart performance

References

De-Phazz albums
2005 albums